Irvine Park in Orange, California is a  park that became Orange County's first regional park in 1897.

It was listed on the National Register of Historic Places in 1983 and includes six contributing buildings, four contributing structures and four contributing objects.

See also
National Register of Historic Places listings in Orange County, California

References

External links

Parks in Orange County, California
Regional parks in California
Orange, California
1897 establishments in California
Protected areas established in 1897
National Register of Historic Places in Orange County, California
Parks on the National Register of Historic Places in California